Robert Gillespie Adamson IV (born July 11, 1985) is an American actor. He has portrayed the roles of Phil Sanders on the television series Hollywood Heights and Charles Antoni on Lincoln Heights. He starred as Noah Newman on The Young and the Restless from 2012 to 2020.

Personal life

Adamson attended the American Academy of Dramatic Arts until 2005. Adamson and then-fiancée  Linsey Godfrey welcomed daughter Aleda Seren, on June 12, 2014. He and Godfrey made their last public appearance together on April 26, 2015 at the Daytime Emmy Awards. On August 3, 2015, after months of speculation, a representative for The Bold and the Beautiful confirmed that Adamson and Godfrey had ended their engagement, however, they would continue to raise their daughter "in a loving and amicable environment and her needs will always be their common priority".

Career
Adamson's first role was in the series Cold Case as a fraternity brother of a murder suspect. He also guest-starred in the series It's Always Sunny in Philadelphia and had a part in the horror movie Dr. Chopper. From 2007 to 2009, he portrayed teenager Charles Antoni on the ABC Family drama Lincoln Heights. In 2009, he starred as Donny in the Disney Channel Original Movie Princess Protection Program alongside Disney stars Demi Lovato and Selena Gomez. He also guest-starred on Disney's Sonny With a Chance.

On August 24, 2012, Adamson replaced his former Princess Protection Program co-star Kevin G. Schmidt as Noah Newman on the CBS Daytime soap opera The Young and the Restless. He taped his first scenes on September 4, for a first appearance on October 1.

Filmography

Films

Television

Video games

References

External links 
 
 Interview

1985 births
American male television actors
Living people
21st-century American male actors
American male soap opera actors
People from Salt Lake City